Yasmina Reza (born 1 May 1959) is a French playwright, actress, novelist and screenwriter best known for her plays 'Art' and God of Carnage. Many of her brief satiric plays have reflected on contemporary middle-class issues. The 2011 black comedy film Carnage, directed by Roman Polanski, was based on Reza's Tony Award-winning 2006 play God of Carnage.

Life and career
Reza's father was a Russian-born Bukharan Jewish engineer, businessman, and pianist and her mother was a Jewish Hungarian violinist from Budapest. During the Nazi occupation, her father was deported from Nice to Drancy internment camp. At the beginning of her career, Reza acted in several new plays as well as in plays by Molière and Marivaux.

In 1987, she wrote Conversations after a Burial, which won the Molière Award, the French equivalent of the Tony Award, for Best Author. The North American production premiered in February 2013 at Players by the Sea in Jacksonville Beach Florida. Holly Gutshall and Joe Schwarz directed; with Set Design by Anne Roberts. The cast for this US debut was Kevin Bodge, Paul Carelli, Karen Overstreet, Dave Gowan, Holly Gutshall and Olivia Gowan Snell. Reza translated Roman Polanski's stage version of Kafka's Metamorphosis in the late 1980s.
Her second play, Winter Crossing, won the 1990 Molière Award for Best Fringe Production, and her next play, The Unexpected Man, enjoyed successful productions in England, France, Scandinavia, Germany and New York.

In 1994, 'Art' premiered in Paris and went on to win the Molière Award for Best Author. Since then it has been produced internationally and translated and performed in over 30 languages. The London production, produced by David Pugh and Dafydd Rogers, received the 1996–97 Laurence Olivier Award and Evening Standard Award, the former is the British equivalent of the Tony's. It also won the Tony Award for Best Play.  has also been produced in Europe, North America and Australia.  Screenwriting credits include See You Tomorrow, starring Jeanne Moreau and directed by Reza's then-partner Didier Martiny.

In September 1997, her first novel, Hammerklavier, was published and another work of fiction, Une Désolation, was published in 2001. Her 2007 work L'Aube le Soir ou la Nuit (Dawn Evening or Night), written after a year of following the campaign of Nicolas Sarkozy caused a sensation in France.

On 24 November 2007, her play Le Dieu du Carnage (God of Carnage), directed by Jürgen Gosch and performed first in Zürich, received the Viennese Nestroy Theatre Prize for the best German-language performance of the season. It opened in London in March 2008, directed by Matthew Warchus in a translation by Christopher Hampton starring Ralph Fiennes, Tamsin Greig, Janet McTeer and Ken Stott. It was produced once again by David Pugh and Dafydd Rogers. The London production won the Laurence Olivier Award for Best New Comedy, which Hampton accepted on her behalf. Hampton told the audience that Reza would be thrilled by the win. The play premiered on Broadway with an opening night cast of James Gandolfini, Jeff Daniels, Marcia Gay Harden, and Hope Davis. God of Carnage won Best Play at the 2009 Tony Awards.

In collaboration with Polanski, Reza wrote the screenplay adaptation of her own play God of Carnage for the 2011 Polanski film Carnage. She was nominated at the European Film Awards and won a César Award for her screenwriting and the film won a Little Gold Lion at the 68th Venice International Film Festival.

Her 2016 novel, Babylone, received the Prix Renaudot. The English version, translated by Linda Asher, was published by Seven Stories Press in 2018.

Awards and honors

1987 Molière Award for Best Author (Conversations After a Burial)
1988 Molière Award for Translation (Metamorphosis)
1990 Molière Award for Best Fringe Production (Winter Crossing)
1994 Molière Award for Best Author, Best Play and Best Production (Art)
1998 Laurence Olivier Award for Best Comedy (Art)
1998 Tony for Best Play (Art)
2000 
2005 Welt-Literaturpreis
2009 Laurence Olivier Award for Best Comedy (God of Carnage)
2009 Tony for Best Play (God of Carnage)
2012 Cinema Writers Circle Award (Spain) for Best Screenplay (Adapted), for Carnage
2012 César Award (France) for Best Screenplay (Adapted), for Carnage
2016 Prix Renaudot, Babylone
2020 Prix Jonathan Swift

Works

Plays
Conversations après un enterrement (1987). Conversations After a Burial, trans. Christopher Hampton (2000).
La Traversée de l'hiver (1989). The Passage of Winter.
« Art » (1994). 'Art''', trans. Christopher Hampton (1997).L'Homme du hasard (1995). The Unexpected Man, trans. Christopher Hampton (1997).Trois versions de la vie (2000). Life x 3, trans. Christopher Hampton (2003).Une pièce espagnole (2004). A Spanish Play.Le Dieu du Carnage (2006). God of Carnage, trans. Christopher Hampton (2007).Bella figura (2015).

NovelsHammerklavier (1997).Une désolation (1999). Desolation, trans. Carol Brown Janeway (2002).Adam Haberberg (2003).Nulle part (2005).Dans la luge d'Arthur Schopenhauer (2005). On Arthur Schopenhauer's Sledge.L'Aube le soir ou la nuit (2007). Dawn Dusk or Night: My Year With Nicolas Sarkozy, trans. Carol Brown Janeway (2008).Heureux les heureux (2013). Happy Are the Happy, trans. John Cullen (2015).Babylone (2016). Babylon, trans. Linda Asher (2018).Anne-Marie la Beauté (2020). Anne-Marie the Beauty, trans. Linda Asher (2021).Serge (2021)

ScreenplaysJusqu'à la nuit (1983). Till Night.Le Pique-nique de Lulu Kreutz (2000). Lulu Kreutz's Picnic.Chicas (2010). Both screenwriter and director.Carnage (2011).

As actorQue les gros salaires lèvent le doigt ! (1982). Let the Fat Cats Lift a Finger!Jusqu'à la nuit (1983). Till Night.À demain (1991). Till Tomorrow.Loin (2001). Faraway. Further reading 

 Les fruits de la passion: le théâtre de Yasmina Reza, by Hélène Jaccomard (Bern: Peter Lang, 2013).

References

External linksYasmina Reza: Please stop laughing at me, by Agnes Poirier: Independent on Sunday'', 16 March 2008 
 The Plays of Yasmina Reza on the English and American Stage (by Amanda Giguere) 

1959 births
Living people
Actresses from Paris
20th-century French Jews
French women novelists
French translators
French stage actresses
Jewish dramatists and playwrights
Knights of the Ordre national du Mérite
French people of Hungarian-Jewish descent
Bukharan Jews
French women dramatists and playwrights
French film actresses
L'École Internationale de Théâtre Jacques Lecoq alumni
University of Paris alumni
Prix Renaudot winners